The Glimpses of the Moon may refer to:

 The Glimpses of the Moon (novel), a 1922 novel by Edith Wharton
 The Glimpses of the Moon (film), a lost 1923 silent film based on Wharton's novel
 The Glimpses of the Moon (Crispin novel), a 1977 novel by Edmund Crispin